Delfino della Pergola (1398–1465) was a Roman Catholic prelate who served as Bishop of Modena (1463–1465) and Bishop of Parma (1425–1463).

Biography
Delfino della Pergola was born in 1398.
On 24 Aug 1425, he was appointed during the papacy of Pope Martin V as Bishop of Parma.
On 18 Sep 1426, he was consecrated bishop by Pietro Grassi, Bishop of Pavia. 
On 24 Sep 1463, he was appointed during the papacy of Pope Pius II as Bishop of Modena.
He served as Bishop of Modena until his death in 1465.

While bishop, he was the principal co-consecrator of Jacopo-Antonio dalla Torre, Bishop of Reggio Emilia (1439); and Carlo Gabriele Sforza, Archbishop of Milan (1454).

References

External links and additional sources
 (for Chronology of Bishops) 
 (for Chronology of Bishops) 
 (for Chronology of Bishops) 
 (for Chronology of Bishops) 

15th-century Italian Roman Catholic bishops
Bishops appointed by Pope Martin V
Bishops appointed by Pope Pius II
1398 births
1465 deaths